VP (3,3,5-Trimethylcyclohexyl 3-pyridyl methylphosphonate), also known as EA-1511, is an extremely toxic organophosphate nerve agent of the V-series.

Agent VP belongs to a class of organophosphates known as 3-pyridyl phosphonates. These agents are extremely potent acetylcholinesterase inhibitors.

Synthesis
Methylphosphonic dichloride and triethylamine are dissolved in benzene. 3,3,5-Trimethylcyclohexanol is then slowly added while stirring and cooling. The reaction temperature is maintained at 10-15 °C. The mixture is then heated to 40 °C for 1 hour. A benzene solution of 3,3,5-trimethylcyclohexyl methylphosphonochloridate is formed.

Triethylamine is then added to reaction mixture and 3-pyridol is added slowly while stirring and cooling. The reaction temperature is maintained at 35 °C. The mixture is then stirred for 1 hour at room temperature. The mixture is washed with a sodium hydroxide solution and water. The solvent is then removed by distillation at reduced pressure to yield the final product. The resulting product can be converted to a quaternary salt by reacting with a haloalkane, such as methyl iodide, to produce a water-soluble agent.

See also
2-Ethoxycarbonyl-1-methylvinyl cyclohexyl methylphosphonate
A-234 (nerve agent)
GV (nerve agent)
Ro 3-0422
V-sub x

References

V-series nerve agents
Acetylcholinesterase inhibitors
3,3,5-Trimethylcyclohexyl esters
3-Pyridyl compounds
Phosphonate esters